Sailing, for the 2019 Island Games, held at the Royal Gibraltar Yacht Club, Gibraltar in July 2019.

Medal table

Results

References 

2019 Island Games
2019
Island Games